The Chhattisgarh High Court is one of the High Courts in India located at Village Bodri, Bilaspur with jurisdiction over the state of Chhattisgarh. It was established on 1 November 2000 with the creation of New state of Chhattisgarh upon the reorganisation of the state of Madhya Pradesh. The High Court of Bilaspur is the 19th High Court of India.

Justice R. S. Garg was the first acting Chief Justice of the Chhattisgarh High Court.

The Judges 

The Chhattisgarh High Court sits at Bilaspur in the state of Chhattisgarh, and may have a maximum of 22 judges, of which 17 may be permanent and 5 may be additionally appointed. Currently, it has 13 judges.

Permanent judges

Additional judges

List of Chief Justices

Judges
The court has a Sanctioned strength of 22 (Permanent:17, Additional:5) judges.

Judges transferred from the Chhattisgarh High Court-

Sitting Judges of Chhattisgarh High Court-

Chhattisgarh High Court Bar Association
Chhattisgarh High Court Bar Association is the representative body of advocates practicing in Bilaspur High Court elected by way of direct voting from about 2400 members of the Bar Association and its officials have a term of two years.

References

External links
 Jurisdiction and Seats of Indian High Courts
 Judge strength in High Courts increased
Official Website
Official Website

Government of Chhattisgarh
2000 establishments in Chhattisgarh
Courts and tribunals established in 2000